= Saluppapatti =

- Village
- Location in Tamil Nadu, India Saluppapatti (India)
- Coordinates: 9.47°N 77.46°E
- Country: India
- State: Tamil Nadu
- District: Madurai
- Elevation: 150 m (490 ft)

Population (2001)
  - Total: 780

Languages
  - Official: Tamil
- Time zone: UTC+5:30 (IST)
- PIN: 625705
- Telephone code: 04552

Saluppaptti is a small village near the Western Ghats in the Madurai district in India. It is located 45 km west from Madurai town. The village was under the Saptur Polygar territory during British India. Now this village comes under the Sedapatti block.
